Armenian rock describes a wide variety of forms of rock music made in Armenia or by artists of Armenian descent.

Among the most recognized groups of Soviet era were Arthur Meschian's "Arakyalner", "1+2", "Kaleidoscope", and "Bliki". Following the loosening of state control in the early 1980s, a number of Armenian rock bands gained followers in Western Europe, such as Asparez and Ayas. Asparez was the only Armenian rock act to release an LP on the iconic Soviet label Melodiya. The bands Tarerk, Tessilk, 36.6 and Maximum had strong followings at home.

History

Soviet Era
Rock was greatly restricted for most of the period Armenia was under Soviet rule, being viewed by the CPSU as a Western anti-socialist influence. Yet, by the early 1970s, there were a range of popular bands in the capital city of Yerevan strong enough to compete with their Soviet counterparts - Arthur Meschian's "Arakyalner", "1+2", "Kaleidoscope" and "Bliki".

By the eighties, combining  Armenian folk music with rock, the Armenian folk-rock groups were founded with notable, and popular even in 2000's, representatives - Bambir, founded 1978 in Leninakan and Vostan Hayots, founded in 1986 in Yerevan. In 1982 Bambir won the "Folk Music Award" at the International Festival in Lida, Belarus. Other more obscure groups were also founded in the same time period like Zartong a short-lived Armenian folk group.

As the Soviet rock scene grew larger in the late 1980s, bands like Asparez and Ayas attracted international audiences due to the new popularity of oriental rock these two bands were among original contributors, that was described first time in Melodie und Rhythmus magazine. Ayas was formed in 1986 by a conservatory graduate Artur Mitinyan, and a year later won Best Song of the Year award at Yerevan's "Rock, Rock, Rock Festival". Later they won the "Sisian Rock Festival" award as well. Elips was another important band of the era formed in 1986. In summer 1986 “Elips” went on tour to Latvia, where they played together with a Riga-based group “Pilligrim”. Simultaneously with the fame, the group gained the hatred of the Soviet Communist party nomenclature and was prohibited as an anti-Soviet group. Their most popular song - "Patkeratsrek" (Imagine) remains as one of the hymns of Armenian rock.

Post-Soviet Era
In the early 1990s, an Armenian progressive rock scene developed. Dumbarton Oaks was one of the first bands trying to combine rock with classical music, an example of this is "Once Upon a Time There Lived a Cadence". The psychedelic side of prog-rock was represented in the much heavier works of MDP. Though only in the 2000s Artsruni and Oaksenham released their albums with the leading French label, Musea, being the pioneers among local bands releasing albums beyond sentimental market. Both bands boast presence of their albums on iTunes and Allmusic.com. Other popular Armenian rock bands of this era included Breeze, Ambehr, The Kings' Cross, Alter Ego, IF by Hayk F. Gyolchanyan, Lav Eli and Empyray. Beerdingungs Lauten was the only representative of grindcore style.  Former "Lav Eli" guitarist Gor Mkhitarian is currently involved with the folk rock scene in the United States regularly releasing his albums there.

A notable example is Deti Picaso a Russia-based folk prog-band consisted of mostly Armenians was noticed and appreciated in Armenia and revived interest towards folk music. 

In the same early 1990s the Armenian rock bands got to have a fanzine - Mark's Gazette,
self-published by Arman Padaryan (aka Mark) for the next 10 years.

Expatriate Armenian rock
Expatriate Armenian rock musicians in the US during the 1990s were few, with fewer venues for them to perform. Tigran Mousoian, president of The Armenian Musicians & Artists Center, had organized two festivals in Yerevan, and then planned Armenian Rock Festival in Glendale, California.

Audience in Armenia
The audience in Armenia remains exceedingly small for local rock groups, playing in local clubs in Yerevan and Gyumri. Although "SARD", "Bambir 2", "Vordan Karmir", "Reincarnation" and speed-metal band "Aramazd" started to receive media attention, especially after their videos were televised nationally. "Roxygeen" was heading the scene of cover-bands, while STRYFE and Sworn are prog-metal bands. The revived MDP and Oaksenham in addition to "Bambir 2", "Blood Covenant", STRYFE, Sworn and Empyray led the vanguard of quality made native rock in the new millennium.
Arthur Meschian had sold-out concerts in Yerevan Opera Theatre and  Complex Sports and Concerts Complex.
Also the most popular Alternative Rock band in the world from Armenia is The Beautified Project. The band has played concerts in Armenia, UK, Austria, Germany, France, Russia and Georgia.

Music Awards
Since 2004 International Armenian Music Award announces winners in various rock categories. Among laureates and nominees there were Bambir 2, Empyray, Oaksenham, Hexen, Gor Mkhitaryan, Red Snow (band) and others. In 2009 Lebanese Armenian, Eileen Khatchadourian's album Midan received the award of the Best Rock Album of the year.  
Another ceremony is Armenia's  National Music Awards showcase of the Armenian Television 1st Channel, which claims best performers of the year in Armenia. At the 6th ceremony, which took place on March 27, 2010, the best rock group was announced Dorians, a group featuring a singer Gor Sujyan.

Unfortunately both awards has not gained authority, and are often boycotted by more intransigent Armenian rock musicians.

Rock Festivals
In the late 1990s and early 2000s, festivals organized by the ACCEA (Armenian Center for Contemporary Experimental Art) signaled a rebirth of the Armenian rock music scene, with many new bands and musicians coming from the heartland region of Vanadzor. Among the most popular bands at that time there were "Vostan Hayots", "Angels", and punk rockers "Ass Kissers". There was a splash of interest in very heavy acts such as "Beerdigungs Läuten" playing quality grindcore metal.

In September 2007 Rock4Peace festival concerts organized with participation of Germans from Kultur Aktiv e.V. and Vibrographus were held in Yerevan, Gyumri and Stepanakert.
The reunion of Ayas took place after the meeting of the band's core musicians in Moscow,
whilst Vostan Hayots continued irregularly appear with club concerts in Yerevan. Armenian rock started to live another wave of revival and yet local rock music does not have an industrial sense, though Armenian rock musicians started to participate in the commercially and politically biased projects such as two "Rock-and-Dram" festivals were held, on April 13 and November 23, 2007.

Tigran Mousoian, president of The Armenian Musicians & Artists Center, organized two festivals in Yerevan, and planned Armenian Rock Festival in Glendale, California.

Concerts by outside groups
A range of top-class concerts featuring legendary rock groups has been organized in Armenia by Vibrgraphus in 2009 and 2010 including visits of Jethro Tull, Uriah Heep,  John McLaughlin and Deep Purple.

Other activity
Harutyun Ayvazyan   (Artyom) was the first Armenian journalist, who published a rock encyclopedia in St. Petersburg in Russian language  at Avgust Publishing House.

References

Armenian music
Armenian rock music
Music scenes
Rock music genres